Claudio Grassi may refer to:

 Claudio Grassi (politician) (born 1955)
 Claudio Grassi (tennis) (born 1985)